Standaard Uitgeverij is a Belgian publisher, and the leading publisher in the Dutch language market of Flanders.

History
In 1919, the Standaard group was created, mainly consisting of a chain of bookshops (Standaard Boekhandel), a newspaper (De Standaard) and a publishing house, the Standaard Uitgeverij. By the 1930s, the different branches became more and more independent, but only in the 1980s was the group finally disbanded. In 1994, the company was acquired by the Dutch group PCM Algemene Boeken BV.

The company is best known for its comics and popular literature, but also publishes youth literature, non-fiction (mainly cartography, lexicography, and massmarket titles), and multimedia publications. A more purely literary imprint is Manteau, formerly an independent publisher founded by Angèle Manteau now owned by Standaard.

With Harry Potter and Kiekeboe, Standaard Uitgeverij published the four bestselling books in Flanders in 2007. Other popular books were the thrillers by Pieter Aspe and TV tie-ins like the Ketnet Doeboek.

Major authors and titles

Comics
Suske en Wiske
Kiekeboe
Nero
Urbanus
The Smurfs (translations)
Biebel

Literature
Pieter Aspe (Manteau)

Youth literature
Harry Potter (translations)

Non fiction
Goedele Liekens
Standaard Ontdekkingen, Dutch translations of Découvertes Gallimard

Notes

External links
Homepage of Standaard Uitgeverij

Book publishing companies of Belgium
Comic book publishing companies of Belgium
Belgian brands
Publishing companies established in 1919
Belgian companies established in 1919
Companies based in Antwerp